Cuba is a village in Sandoval County, New Mexico, United States. As of the 2010 census, the village population was 735. It is part of the Albuquerque Metropolitan Statistical Area.

Description

Located along the busy U.S. Route 550, Cuba has several motels, restaurants and bars. In 2005 and 2019, the National Christmas Tree was harvested from the Santa Fe National Forest near Cuba.

Geography
Cuba is located at  (36.018325, -106.959642).

Demographics

As of the census of 2000, there were 590 people, 222 households, and 152 families residing in the village. The population density was 465.3 people per square mile (179.4/km). There were 290 housing units at an average density of 228.7 per square mile (88.2/km). The racial makeup of the village was 44.07% white, 0.17% African American, 26.78% Native American, 0.68% Asian, 23.90% from other races, and 4.41% from two or more races. Hispanic or Latino of any race were 60.34% of the population.

There were 222 households, out of which 38.3% had children under the age of 18 living with them, 43.7% were married couples living together, 18.9% had a female householder with no husband present, and 31.1% were non-families. 29.3% of all households were made up of individuals, and 8.1% had someone living alone who was 65 years of age or older. The average household size was 2.66 and the average family size was 3.24.

In the village, the population was spread out, with 33.2% under the age of 18, 7.8% from 18 to 24, 23.9% from 25 to 44, 21.9% from 45 to 64, and 13.2% who were 65 years of age or older. The median age was 32 years. For every 100 females, there were 99.3 males. For every 100 females age 18 and over, there were 95.0 males.

The median income for a household in the village was $21,538, and the median income for a family was $26,250. Males had a median income of $26,667 versus $17,000 for females. The per capita income for the village was $11,192. About 36.5% of families and 41.3% of the population were below the poverty line, including 54.1% of those under age 18 and 40.0% of those age 65 or over.

Climate

Education
Its district is Cuba Independent Schools.

See also

References

External links

Villages in Sandoval County, New Mexico
Villages in New Mexico
Albuquerque metropolitan area